Sargodha Division is an administrative division of Punjab province, Pakistan. Sargodha city is the capital of the division. According to the 2017 Census of Pakistan, the total population of the division was 8.18 million. Divisions are the third tier of government below the federal and provincial levels.

In 2000, local government reforms abolished administrative divisions and raised the districts to become the new third tier of government. But in 2008, the division system was restored again.

Districts 

It consists of the following districts:

Demographics 
According to 2017 census, Sargodha division had a population of 8,381,499, which included 4,120,223 males and 4,046,036 females. 
Sargodha division constitutes 70 Hindus, 8,074,474 Muslims, 84,447 Christians, 7,698 Ahmadis followed by 117 scheduled castes and 231 others.

Notable people 
 Malik Shakir Bashir Awan - President Tanzeem ul Awan, Politician, Lawyer, Social Activist 
 Mohammad Hafeez – former captain of Pakistan national cricket team and Lahore Qalandars player
 Attaullah Khan Esakhelvi – Pakistani award-winning musician from Isakhel, Mianwali.
 Suhail Warraich – journalist and television host from Jauharabad, Khushab.
 Imran Khan – former Prime Minister of Pakistan from Mianwali.
 Misbah-ul-Haq – former Test captain and head coach of the Pakistan cricket team.

See also 
 Divisions of Pakistan
 Divisions of Punjab, Pakistan

References 

Divisions of Punjab, Pakistan
Sargodha